Jacob Radcliff or Radclift (April 20, 1764 – May 6, 1844) was a jurist, lawyer and politician.

He served as Mayor of New York City from 1810 to 1811, and from 1815 to 1818.

Early life and education
He was born on April 20, 1764, in Rhinebeck, Dutchess County, New York. 

Radcliff graduated from Princeton University in 1783

Career and marriage
Radcliff practiced law under Egbert Benson, the first New York Attorney General. He was admitted to the bar in 1786.

About the same time, he married Juliana Smith, the daughter of Cotton Mather Smith and granddaughter of Cotton Mather.

While practicing law in Poughkeepsie, New York, he was a member of the New York State Assembly (Dutchess County) in the 1795 18th New York State Legislature and was one of the twelve members of the Joint Committee on Elections of the Senate and Assembly of New York. 

He was appointed Assistant Attorney General on February 23, 1796.

On December 27, 1798, he became a justice of the New York Supreme Court. In this position, he helped revise the state's laws. He resigned from the bench in 1804, and practiced chancery law in Brooklyn.

When the Federalist Party gained the majority in 1810, Radcliff was appointed mayor of New York City. When the War of 1812 divided the Federalist party, Radcliff aligned with the Tammany Society, which was poised to gain a majority in state politics. Grand Sachem of Tammany Hall John Ferguson became mayor in 1815 but resigned to take the appointment of Surveyor of the Port of New York. Radcliff was chosen as his replacement.

Death
He died in Troy, New York, on May 6, 1844.

References

Mayors of New York City
1764 births
1844 deaths
18th-century American judges
18th-century American lawyers
18th-century American politicians
19th-century American judges
19th-century American lawyers
19th-century American politicians
Lawyers from Brooklyn
Members of the New York State Assembly
New York (state) Democratic-Republicans
New York (state) Federalists
New York (state) state court judges
Politicians from Brooklyn
Politicians from Poughkeepsie, New York
People from Rhinebeck, New York
Princeton University alumni